The 1947 All-Ireland Minor Hurling Championship was the 17th staging of the All-Ireland Minor Hurling Championship since its establishment by the Gaelic Athletic Association in 1928.

Dublin entered the championship as the defending champions, however, they were beaten by Galway in the All-Ireland semi-final.

On 7 September 1947 Tipperary won the championship following a 9-5 to 1-5 defeat of Galway in the All-Ireland final. This was their fifth All-Ireland title and their first in ten championship seasons.

Results

All-Ireland Minor Hurling Championship

Semi-finals

Final

Championship statistics

Miscellaneous

 The All-Ireland semi-final between Dublin and Galway was the first ever championship meeting between the two teams.

External links
 All-Ireland Minor Hurling Championship: Roll Of Honour

Minor
All-Ireland Minor Hurling Championship